Bovine mastitis is the persistent, inflammatory reaction of the udder tissue due to physical trauma or microorganisms infections. Mastitis, a potentially fatal mammary gland infection, is the most common disease in dairy cattle in the United States and worldwide. It is also the most costly disease to the dairy industry. Milk from cows suffering from mastitis has an increased somatic cell count.
Prevention and control of mastitis requires consistency in sanitizing the cow barn facilities, proper milking procedure and segregation of infected  animals.
Treatment of the disease is carried out by penicillin injection in combination with sulphar drug

Definition
Mastitis occurs when white blood cells (leukocytes) are released into the mammary gland, usually in response to bacteria invading the teat canal or occasionally by chemical, mechanical, or thermal trauma on the udder. Milk-secreting tissue and various ducts throughout the mammary gland are damaged due to toxins released by the bacteria resulting in reduced milk yield  and quality.

Identification

This disease can be identified by abnormalities in the udder such as swelling, heat, redness, hardness, or pain (if it is clinical). Other indications of mastitis may be abnormalities in milk such as a watery appearance, flakes, or clots. When infected with sub-clinical mastitis, a cow does not show any visible signs of infection or abnormalities in milk or on the udder.

Mastitis-causing bacteria

Bacteria that are known to cause mastitis include:

These bacteria can be classified as environmental or contagious depending on mode and source of transmission.

Types of mastitis
Mastitis may be classified according two different criteria: either according to the clinical symptoms or depending on the mode of transmission.        
Clinical symptoms
 Clinical mastitis : The form in which macroscopic changes in the milk and udder of the milch animal is easily detectable by the milker.
 Sub-Clinical mastitis : The form in which the milk and udder of the milch animal appear normal and can be diagnosed by testing of milk samples for various compositional changes and presence of pathogens and somatic cells.
 per acute mastitis
 acute mastitis
 sub acute mastitis
 chronic mastitis : This form includes no pain in the udder but little compositional changes in the milk.
Mode of transmission
 Contagious mastitis also known as bovine mastitis
 Environmental mastitis
 Summer mastitis (which occurs in summer months in heifers or unmilked cows)

Transmission
Mastitis is most often transmitted by repetitive contact with the milking machine, and through contaminated hands or materials.

Another route is via the oral-to-udder transmission among calves. Feeding calves on milk may introduce some mastitis causing bacteria strain in the oral cavity of the calf where it will stay dormant until it is transmitted elsewhere. Since grouped calves like to stimulate suckling, they will transmit the bacteria to the udder tissue of their fellow calves. The bacteria will lay dormant in the udder tissue as the calf grows until it begins to lactate. That is when the bacteria activates and causes mastitis. This calls for strict calf management practices to curb this route of transmission. Micro-organisms enter through the teat tip into the teat duct where they get colonized due to the presence of leftover milk in the duct and subsequently spread throughout the udder causing infection. The effect of unhygienic milking machines and incomplete milking can help in this infection.

Effects on milk composition

Mastitis can cause a decline in potassium and an increase in lactoferrin. It also results in decreased casein, the major protein in milk. 
As most calcium in milk is associated with casein, the disruption of casein synthesis contributes to lowered calcium in milk.  The milk protein continues to undergo further deterioration during processing and storage.  Milk from cows with mastitis also has a higher somatic cell count. Generally speaking, the higher the somatic cell count, the lower the milk quality. It also has a high microbial count. This reduces it's yield.

Constituents with increased constitution 
The levels of total whey proteins (Mainly bovine serum albumin, immunoglobulins) (Na and Cl ions) and other ions (Cu, Fe, Zn) various enzymes and certain glycoproteins increase significantly. The pH of the milk increases too. Enzymes namely protease, lipase, aldolase , sorbitol, dehydrogenase also get increased.

Constituents with decreased constitution 
The levels of lactose, fat, total casein (alpha and beta fractions decrease but gamma fraction increase ) some whey proteins (alpha-lactalbumin and beta-lactoglobulin) potassium and other minerals (Ca, Mg, P) decreases. Mastitic milk generally has lower SNF (solid-not-fat). Xanthine oxidase reduces by nearly half.

Detection

Cattle affected by mastitis can be detected by examining the udder for inflammation and swelling, or by observing the consistency of the milk, which will often develop clots or change color when a cow is infected.

Another method of detection is the California mastitis test, which is designed to measure the milk's somatic cell count as a means for detecting inflammation and infection of the udder.

The pH value of mastitic milk is higher than that of normal milk. On mixing 5ml of milk with 1 ml of bromothymol blue, the appearance of blue green colour indicated mastitic milk which has a pH of 6.8 or more as against the grass green colour produced by normal milk that has a pH of 6.6.

Normal milk has a chloride content of 0.08 to 0.14% whereas abnormal milk has more than 0.14%. The chloride content of milk can be estimated by addition of silver nitrate solution and 2 to 3 drops of potassium chromate as an indicator, A yellow colour indicates that the milk is abnormal.

Catalase test is also used to detect catalase which is present only in mastitic milk.

Resazurin rennet test is based on the disturbance in the salt balance and increase in leucocyte content in mastitic milk. Coagulation of milk by rennet is sowed down due to disturbed salt balance and leucocytes reduce resazurin dye faster. Mastitic samples give delayed coagulation but faster resazurin reduction compared to normal milk

Treatment
Treatment is possible with antibiotics - such as penicillin,  but milk from such cows is not marketable until drug residues have left the cow's system.  Antibiotics may be systemic (injected into the body), or they may be forced upwards into the teat through the teat canal (intramammary infusion). Cows being treated may be marked with tape to alert dairy workers, and their milk is syphoned off and discarded. To determine whether the levels of antibiotic residuals are within regulatory requirements, special tests exist. Vaccinations for mastitis are available, but as they only reduce the severity of the condition, and cannot prevent reoccurring infections, they should be used in conjunction with a mastitis prevention program.

Control
Practices such as good nutrition, proper milking hygiene, and the culling of chronically infected cows can help.
Ensuring that cows have clean, dry bedding decreases the risk of infection and transmission.  Dairy workers should wear rubber gloves while milking, and machines should be cleaned regularly to decrease the incidence of transmission.

Prevention
A good milking routine is vital.  This usually consists of applying a pre-milking teat dip or spray, such as an iodine spray, and  wiping teats dry prior to milking.  The milking machine is then applied.  After milking, the teats can be cleaned again to remove any growth medium for bacteria.  A post milking product such as iodine-propylene glycol dip is used as a disinfectant and a barrier between the open teat and the bacteria in the air.
Mastitis can occur after milking because the teat holes close after 15 minutes if the animal sits in a dirty place with feces and urine.

Industry costs
This disease costs the US dairy industry about 1.7 to 2 billion USD each year.

References

Further reading
Harmon, R. J. 1994. Physiology of mastitis and factors affecting somatic cell counts. J. Dairy Sci. 77:2103-2112.
Jones, G. M., R. E. Pearson, G. A. Clabaugh, and C. W. Heald. 1984. Relationships between somatic cell counts and milk production. J. Dairy Sci. 67:1823-1831.
Myllys, V., and H. Rautala. 1995. Characterization of clinical mastitis in primiparous heifers. J. Dairy Sci. 78:538-545.
National Mastitis Council. 1996. Current Concepts of Bovine Mastitis, 4th ed., Arlington, VA.
Fox LK et al. Survey of intramammary infections in dairy heifers at breeding age and first parturition. J Dairy Sci. 78; 1619–1628, 1995.
Hallberg JW et al. The visual appearance and somatic cell count of mammary secretions collected from primigravid heifers during gestation and early postpartum. J Dairy Sci. 78; 1629-1636.
Hogan JS et al. Efficacy of an Escherichia coli J5 bacterin administered to primigravid heifers. J Dairy Sci. 82; 939-943, 1999.
Nickerson SC. Mastitis and its control in heifers and dry cows. International Symposium on Bovine Mastitis. Indianapolis, IN, September, 1990. pp 82–91.
Nickerson SC et al. Mastitis in dairy heifers: Initial studies on prevalence and control. J Dairy Sci. 78;1607–1618, 1995.
Nickerson SC et al. Efficacy of s Staphylococcus aureus bacterin in dairy herifers. An update. Proceedings of the Nat Mastitis Council Meeting. 295-6, 1998.
Sears PM and Wilson DJ. Heifer mastitis. Bov Practitioner 28; 56-58, 1994.
Blowey R. and Edmondson P. Mastitis control in dairy herds, an illustrated and practical guide.Farming press.

External links

UC Davis fact sheet
NMC - Global organization for mastitis control and milk quality

Dairy farming
Bovine diseases